Megan Pearson is a British actress who is best known for playing Jean Tate in ITV's Emmerdale. She lives in Leeds, England.

References

External links

Year of birth missing (living people)
Living people
English soap opera actresses
Place of birth missing (living people)